Migdal Bavel is the second studio album by De Magia Veterum, released on January 20, 2009 by Mistress Dance Records and Transcendental Creations. It was first issued on cassette, with the pressing limited to a hundred copies.

Critical reception 

Eduardo Rivadavia of allmusic gave the album three out of five stars, saying "this one-Dutchman operation spares no effort to advance black metal's misanthropic agenda, whether through sheer sonic terrorism (see sand-blasting onslaughts like "The Confusion of Tongues," "The Boat of Uta-Napishtim," and "Zaota"), or impressive avant-garde rule breaking (ergo the title track's free jazz percussion and synthesizer hiccups, the serpentine piano tap-dance of "I Am the Vine," and the bubbling synthesized orchestrations of "Rapture")."

Track listing

Personnel
Adapted from Migdal Bavel liner notes.
 Maurice de Jong (as Mories) – vocals, instruments, recording, cover art

Release history

References

External links 
 
 Migdal Bavel at Bandcamp

2009 albums
De Magia Veterum albums